IROC XVII was the seventeenth year of IROC competition, which took place in 1993. It was the fourth and final year the Dodge Daytona was used in competition, and continued the format introduced in IROC VIII. Race one took place on the Daytona International Speedway, race two took place at Darlington Raceway, race three was held at Talladega Superspeedway, and race four ran at Michigan International Speedway. Davey Allison won the series championship posthumously after dying in a helicopter accident at the Talladega Superspeedway. With only one race remaining, Terry Labonte drove the final race, and the points from that race, applied to Allison's previous total, were enough to secure the championship. The winnings of $175,000 were placed in a trust fund for Allison's children. 

The roster of drivers and final points standings were as follows:

Individual Race results

Race One, Daytona International Speedway
Friday, February 12th, 1993

one *: Bonus points for leading the most laps.two **: Bonus points for leading the 2nd most laps.three ***: Bonus points for leading the 3rd most laps.

Average speed: 181.726 mphCautions: 1Margin of victory: 1 car lengthLead changes: 10

Race Two, Darlington Raceway
Saturday, March 27th, 1993

one *: Bonus points for leading the most laps.two **: Bonus points for leading the 2nd most laps.three ***: Bonus points for leading the 3rd most laps.

Average speed: 142.47 mphCautions: 3Margin of victory: .63 secLead changes: 2

Cautions

Lap Leaders

Race Three, Talladega Superspeedway
Saturday May 1st, 1993

one *: Bonus points for leading the most laps.two **: Bonus points for leading the 2nd most laps.three ***: Bonus points for leading the 3rd most laps.

Average speed: 190.716 mphCautions: n/aMargin of victory: .25 clLead changes: 18

Race Four, Michigan International Speedway
Saturday, July 31st, 1993

one *: Bonus points for leading the most laps.two **: Bonus points for leading the 2nd most laps.three ***: Bonus points for leading the 3rd most laps.

Average speed: 159.017 mphCautions: noneMargin of victory: 0.41 secLead changes: 7

Notes
 Davey Allison was awarded the championship posthumously. Terry Labonte drove the final race in Allison's place, and Labonte's points were added to Allison's point total.
 Alan Kulwicki was killed in a plane crash on April 1, 1993. Dale Earnhardt drove in his place, and all the points Earnhardt earned were applied to Kulwicki's point total. The prize money for finishing fifth in points was donated to the Winston Cup Racing Wives Auxiliary, Brenner Children's Hospital and St. Thomas Aquinas Church charities. 
 Geoff Brabham and Harry Gant tied for sixth place in the final points standings, but Brabham was awarded the position due to a better finishing position in the final race.
 Juan Manuel Fangio II withdrew from the series before the final race.
 Dale Earnhardt started in place of an injured Al Unser Jr., Earnhardt was awarded no points for the race, and Unser Jr. shared 11th and 12th place points with Arie Luyendyk, who also did not start due to injury.
 Rusty Wallace started in place of an injured Arie Luyendyk. Wallace did not receive points for the start, and Luyendyk shared 11th and 12th place points with Al Unser Jr., who also did not start due to injury.
 Dale Earnhardt took the place of the late Alan Kulwicki beginning with race three, and all points earned were added to Kulwicki's total.
 Terry Labonte drove in place of the late Davey Allison for the final race, with all points earned added to Allison's total.

References

External links
IROC XVII History - IROC Website

International Race of Champions
1993 in American motorsport